Dalechampia dioscoreifolia is a species of plant in the family Euphorbiaceae first described in 1841. It is native to Central America (Costa Rica, Nicaragua, Panama) and northern and western South America (Colombia, Venezuela, French Guiana, northern Brazil, Bolivia, and possibly Ecuador).

References

Plukenetieae
Flora of Central America
Flora of South America
Plants described in 1841
Taxa named by Eduard Friedrich Poeppig